Smaïl Lahoua Stadium is a multi-use stadium in Tadjenanet, Algeria.It is currently used mostly for football matches stadium is the home ground of DRB Tadjenanet.  The stadium holds 9,000 spectators.

References

Football venues in Algeria
Buildings and structures in Mila Province
DRB Tadjenanet